Timandrini is a tribe of geometer moths (family Geometridae), with about 45 species in four genera. It was described by Stephens in 1850.

Genera
Haematopis Hübner, 1823
Synegiodes Swinhoe, 1892
Timandra Duponchel, 1829
Traminda Saalmuller, 1891

References